Kol is a Putha Uttarganga Rural municipality Ward no.12 in Eastern Rukum District in Lumbini Province of western Nepal. At the time of the 2011 Nepal census it had a population of 3,127 people living in 707 individual households.

References

Populated places in Eastern Rukum District